The Pugsley Medal was created by Cornelius Amory Pugsley in 1928. The award honors champions of parks and conservation.  

Responsibility for selecting the recipients has shifted from the American Scenic and Historic Preservation Society to the National Park Foundation, and most recently to the American Academy for Park and Recreation Administration. Until 1952 there was a gold, silver, and bronze award, and in 1953 it was switched to national, state, and local.

Pugsley Medal winners
1928 Stephen T. Mather, the first director of the National Park Service, gold medal
1928 Duncan McDuffie, silver medal
1929 Mary Williamson Averell, gold medal
1929 Nathaniel Lord Britton, silver medal
1931 Richard Lieber, gold medal
1932 Peter Norbeck, silver medal
1935 John Hayes McLaren, silver medal
1936 Robert Moses, gold medal
1937 J. Horace McFarland, gold medal
1938 Arno B. Cammerer, gold medal
1940 Newton B. Drury, silver medal
1942 Harold L. Ickes, gold medal
1942 Harlean James, bronze medal
1947 Conrad L. Wirth, gold medal
1947 Thomas J. Allen, silver medal
1948 Percival Proctor Baxter, gold medal
1949 Waldo Leland, gold medal
1950 Newton B. Drury, gold medal
1952 Harlean James, gold medal
1953 Frederick Law Olmsted, Jr., gold medal
1954 Harold C. Bryant, national award
1954 Russell Reid, silver award
1955 Loring McMillen, local award
1956 Gilbert Hovey Grosvenor, national award
1959 Alfred A. Knopf, national award
1962 Allen T. Edmunds, gold award
1962 Charles Alvin DeTurk, silver award
1962 Frank G. McInnis, bronze award
1963 Conrad L. Wirth, national award
1965 Harold P. Fabian, gold award
1965 U.W. Hella, silver award
1965 Daniel L. Flaherty, bronze award
1982 John A. Townsley,
1991 Denis P. Galvin, national award
2006 Bill Lane

See also

 List of environmental awards

References

External links
Pugsley Medal Recipients 1928 – 1964
Winners of the Honorable Cornelius Amory Pugsley Awards, American Academy for Park and Recreation Administration

Environmental awards
American awards
Awards established in 1928
Parks in the United States
1928 establishments in the United States